Joywave is an American indie rock band from Rochester, New York, formed in 2010. Their lineup consists of Daniel Armbruster (vocals), Joseph Morinelli (guitar), and Paul Brenner (drums). The band first became known for its collaboration with electronic music project Big Data, "Dangerous", which peaked at number two on the Billboard Rock & Alternative Airplay chart in 2014. After releasing two EPs, their debut album, How Do You Feel Now?, was released through their own Cultco Music label, an imprint of Hollywood Records, in 2015. Their second album, Content, was released on July 28, 2017. It was followed by their third album, Possession, which was released on March 13, 2020. Their fourth album, Cleanse, was released on February 11, 2022.

History

Early years (2010–2013)
All five members of Joywave grew up in Rochester, New York. Armbruster, Brenner and Morinelli played together in various local bands growing up, including The Hoodies. They formed Joywave in Rochester in 2010. Donnelly joined the band soon after, and they released their first mixtape, 77777, in 2011. In 2012, they released their first EP, Koda Vista. In 2013, they released their second mixtape, 88888.

"Dangerous" and How Do You Feel Now? (2014–2016)

Originally a member of Big Data with Alan Wilkis, Armbruster wrote the song “Dangerous”, which was recorded by Wilkis with Armbruster on vocals, and credited to Big Data featuring Joywave. Following the success of “Dangerous”, Joywave's notability continued to rise with the release of their 2014 EP How Do You Feel? The two singles from the EP, "Tongues" (ft. KOPPS) and "Somebody New", achieved considerable popularity on the radio and on YouTube, with the respective music videos each having over 1.8 million views on YouTube as of June 2017. "Tongues" was featured on a Google Nexus commercial and in EA Sports football game, FIFA 15, and the music video for the song was directed by the directing duo Daniels.

Joywave's debut LP, How Do You Feel Now?, was released on April 21, 2015 in the US and June 22, 2015 in the UK. It reached #25 on the Billboard Alternative Albums chart, #34 on the Top Rock Albums chart, and #3 on the Heatseekers Albums chart. In 2016, the band released Swish, which features alternate versions of "Destruction". The title is a reference to Kanye West's 2016 album The Life of Pablo, which was originally going to be titled Swish.

Content (2017–2018)

In April 2017, they released "Content", the first single off their upcoming second album, also titled Content. In May 2017, they released the album's second single, "It's a Trip!". Three other singles were released in the months that followed: "Shutdown," "Doubt," and "Going to a Place." Content was released on July 28, 2017. On June 1, 2018, the band released the song "Compromise", an unreleased song from the How Do You Feel Now? era.

Possession (2018–2020)

On July 12, 2018, the band released the single "Blastoffff". It appears in the Fortnite Season 5 trailer. On June 21, 2019 the single "Like a Kennedy" was released alongside a teaser for the music video. On August 9, 2019, the band released the single "Obsession", in advance of their third album. On November 1, 2019, they released the single "Blank Slate". On January 7, 2020, the band released the song "Half Your Age" and revealed that their third album, Possession, would be released on March 13. They also announced dates for a North American headlining tour, which was ultimately cancelled due to the COVID-19 pandemic.

Cleanse (2021–present)
Their EP Every Window Is a Mirror was released on June 25, 2021, which included four new songs from their upcoming fourth album, Cleanse. Joywave also released a Russian version of Every Window Is a Mirror when they noticed an uptick in streams coming from Russia.

It is also to note that after the EP went live, Joywave started a Q&A series called "Every Question Has an Answer".

On October 29, 2021, the band announced Cleanse alongside the single "Cyn City 2000". The album was released on February 11, 2022.

On June 24, 2022, the band announced a live album titled Live. While the band toured the US, they've recorded multiple shows throughout the aforementioned tour and complied it all into an album. The album was released on July 29, 2022.

Performances
Joywave made their television debut in July 2015 on Late Night with Seth Meyers, performing "Dangerous" and "Tongues". They have also appeared on Jimmy Kimmel Live and VH1's Big Morning Buzz Live.

They opened two shows for The Killers in May 2014. That year, they performed at Lollapalooza in Chicago, and played Osheaga Festival in Montreal. In 2015, they toured the UK with Brandon Flowers, went on a five-week tour with Night Terrors of 1927 and Bleachers, opened for The Kooks, and played Leeds Festival in England. In 2016, they went on a five-week US tour with Metric. In the summer of 2017, they toured across the United States with Young the Giant and Cold War Kids. In November 2017, the band announced the second leg of their Thanks. Thanks for Coming tour, which began in Las Vegas on February 10, 2018. They toured with Thirty Seconds to Mars, Walk the Moon, and MisterWives on Thirty Seconds to Mars's North American tour in the summer of 2018, and in September 2018 they toured with Bishop Briggs. In the autumn of 2019 Joywave joined Bastille's Doom Days tour in America.

In October 2021, the band announced The Cleanse Tour, which began in Harrisburg, PA on February 26, 2022. In the fall of 2022, Joywave coheadlined The Welcome to Hellvetica Tour with I Dont Know How But They Found Me. In August 2022, Joywave announced a UK and EU tour, which began in Dublin, Ireland on November 1, 2022. In December of 2022, they announced another tour of the United States called Express Wash, which will take place in March and April of 2023.

Discography

 How Do You Feel Now? (2015)
 Content (2017)
 Possession (2020)
 Cleanse (2022)

Members

Current
 Daniel Armbruster – lead vocals, guitars, production, pianos 
 Joseph Morinelli – guitar 
 Paul Brenner – drums

Touring
 Kevin Mahoney – bass guitar 
 Connor Ehman - guitar, keyboards, and background vocals (2022–present)
 Taylor Dubray - Guitar, Keyboards, and background vocals (2022-present)

Former
 Travis Johansen – keyboards 
 Sean Donnelly – bass guitar 
 Jeremiah Crespo – bass guitar 
 Benjamin Bailey – keyboards, pianos, synth

Timeline

References

Alternative rock groups from New York (state)
Electronic music groups from New York (state)
Hollywood Records artists
Musical groups established in 2010
Musical groups from Rochester, New York
Musical quintets
2010 establishments in New York (state)